Sirca may refer to:

SIRCA, an acronym with multiple uses

Sirča, a village situated in Kraljevo municipality in Serbia.
Majda Širca, a Slovenian art historian, journalist, and politician.